Formosimyrma is a genus of ants in the subfamily Myrmicinae containing the single species Formosimyrma lanuyensis.

Distribution and habitat
The genus is known only from Taiwan, where it was first collected in an evergreen forest on Lanyu Island.

Etymology
The genus name is derived from Formosa (old name of Taiwan) + myrma (Greek, "ant"); the specific name of the type species (F. lanuyensis) is derived from the type locality.

References

Myrmicinae
Monotypic ant genera
Hymenoptera of Asia